Michael Mayer (born 14 February 1980 in Sulzbach-Rosenberg, Bavaria) is a volleyball player from Germany, who played for the Men's National Team in the 2000s (decade). He played as a wing-spiker.

Honours
2001 FIVB World League — 13th place
2001 European Championship — 9th place
2002 FIVB World League — 9th place
2003 FIVB World League — 10th place

References
  FIVB biography
  DVV Profile

1980 births
Living people
People from Sulzbach-Rosenberg
Sportspeople from the Upper Palatinate
German men's volleyball players